2022 MUAHS Guild Awards
February 11, 2023
Contemporary Make-Up:

Everything Everywhere All at Once

Period/Character Make-Up:

Elvis

Contemporary Hair Styling:

Black Panther: Wakanda Forever

Period/CharacterHair Styling:

Elvis

Special Make-Up Effects:

The Whale

The 15th Make-Up Artists and Hair Stylists Guild Awards, presented by Dyson and HASK Beauty, honored outstanding achievements of both make-up and hair stylists in motion pictures, television, commercials and live theater for 2022 on February 11, 2023, at The Beverly Hilton. The nominations were announced on January 11, 2023. The event was hosted by Melissa Peterman.

Winners and nominees
The winners are listed first and in bold.

Feature-Length Motion Picture

Television Series, Limited, Miniseries or Movie for Television

Television Special, One Hour or More Live Program Series

Daytime Television

Children and Teen Television Programming

Commercials and Music Videos

Theatrical Productions (Live Stage)

Honorary Awards
 Distinguished Artisan Award – Angela Bassett
 Vanguard Award – Fred C. Blau Jr. and Judy Crown
 Lifetime Achievement Award – Steve La Porte and Josée Normand

References

External links
 

2022 film awards
2022 television awards
2022 in American cinema
2022